The BNXT League Finals Most Valuable Player (MVP) award is given annually to the best performing player in the finals series of a BNXT League season, the highest professional basketball league in Belgium and the Netherlands. The winner of the award is determined by the average efficiency rating over the finals series.

Worthy de Jong was the inaugural award winner after receiving it on 11 June 2022.

Winners

References

External links 

 BNXT League - Official Site
 BNXT League - Official Award Page

European basketball awards
BNXT League basketball awards